Justin Tsoulos (born 20 February 1984) is a Greek Australian rugby league former professional footballer who played in the National Rugby League for Canterbury-Bankstown and Parramatta.

Playing career
Tsoulos made his first grade debut on 29 June 2003 as a 19-year-old, playing for the Parramatta Eels against the Newcastle Knights at EnergyAustralia Stadium.

Tsoulos only made 23 appearances for Parramatta, due mainly to a poor run with injury that saw him miss the entire 2006 due to a shoulder injury sustained in a pre-season trial match. 

Tsoulos then signed with Canterbury-Bankstown for the 2008 season. Due to his Greek heritage, Tsoulos was eligible to represent the Greece national rugby league team.

References 

1984 births
Living people
Australian rugby league players
Australian people of Greek descent
Parramatta Eels players
Canterbury-Bankstown Bulldogs players
Rugby league props
Rugby league players from Sydney